Tyronne Jones (born September 12, 1971 in New Orleans, Louisiana) is an American football wide receiver for the New Orleans VooDoo in the Arena Football League. He previously played for the Nashville Kats, the Philadelphia Soul, and the Georgia Force.

College years
Jones attended Grambling State University and was a student and a letterman in football. In football, as a senior, he was named the Southwestern Conference Player of the Year.

Arena Football League career
1998 - Jones played for the Nashville Kats and had an impressive rookie season, as he hauled in 94 receptions for 1054 yards(11.21 yards per reception avg.) and 21 touchdowns, and made 71 kickoff returns for 1,467 yards(20.66 yards per kickoff return avg.) and five touchdowns. After the season, he was named the Nashville Kats 1998 Team MVP and was named to the AFL All-Rookie team.
2001 - Jones played for the Nashville Kats and finished the season with 55 receptions for 794 yards(14.43 yards per reception avg.) and 21 touchdowns.
2004 - Jones played for the Philadelphia Soul in their inaugural season and finished the season with 76 receptions for 1,000 yards(13.16 yards per reception avg.) and 18 touchdowns, and made 46 kickoff returns for 1032 yards(22.43 yards per kickoff return avg.) and four touchdowns.
2005 - Jones played for the Philadelphia Soul and during the season, he appeared in 11 games and grabbed 28 receptions for 416 yards(14.86 yards per reception avg.) and seven touchdowns.

External links
New Orleans VooDoo's bio page
AFL stats

References

1971 births
Living people
Players of American football from New Orleans
American football wide receivers
Grambling State Tigers football players
Nashville Kats players
Philadelphia Soul players
Georgia Force players
New Orleans VooDoo players